The following is a list of foreign films set in Japan. Japan has provided an exotic and cosmopolitan backdrop to many international films set mostly or entirely in Japan.  A common theme of western films set in Japan is the differences between Japanese and Western culture and how the characters cope with their new surroundings.

#
 3 Ninjas: Kick Back (1994) — directed by Charles T. Ganganis, starring Victor Wong and Max Elliot Slade
 47 Ronin (2013) — directed by Carl Rinsch, starring Keanu Reeves and Hiroyuki Sanada

A
 Around the World in Eighty Days (1956) — directed by Michael Anderson, starring David Niven and Cantinflas
 Atout coeur à Tokyo pour OSS 117 (1966) — directed by Michel Boisrond, starring Frederick Stafford and Marina Vlady

B
 Babel (2006) — directed by Alejandro González Iñárritu, starring Brad Pitt, Cate Blanchett and Gael García Bernal
 Back at the Front (1952) — directed by George Sherman, starring Tom Ewell and Harvey Lembeck
 The Bad News Bears Go to Japan (1978) — directed by John Berry, starring Tony Curtis and Jackie Earle Haley
 The Barbarian and the Geisha (1958) — directed by John Huston, starring John Wayne and Eiko Ando
 Black Rain (1989) — directed by Ridley Scott, starring Michael Douglas and Ken Takakura
 Blood on the Sun (1945) — directed by Frank Lloyd, starring James Cagney and Sylvia Sidney
 Bushido Blade (1981) — directed by Shusei Kotani, starring Timothy Patrick Murphy and Frank Converse

C
 Café Lumière (2003) — directed by Hou Hsiao-hsien, starring Yo Hitoto and Tadanobu Asano
 The Challenge (1982) — directed by John Frankenheimer, starring Scott Glenn and Toshirō Mifune
 Cold Fever (1995) — directed by Friðrik Þór Friðriksson, starring Masatoshi Nagase and Lili Taylor

D

E
Earthquake Bird (2019) — directed by Wash Westmoreland, starring Alicia Vikander and Riley Keough
Emperor (2012) — directed by Peter Webber, starring Matthew Fox and Tommy Lee Jones
 Enlightenment Guaranteed (2000) — directed by Doris Dörrie, starring Uwe Ochsenknecht and Gustav-Peter Wöhler
 Enter the Void (2009) — directed by Gaspar Noé, starring Nathaniel Brown and Paz de la Huerta
 Escapade in Japan (1957) — directed by Arthur Lubin, starring Cameron Mitchell and Jon Provost

F
 The Fast and the Furious: Tokyo Drift (2006) — directed by Justin Lin, starring Lucas Black and Bow Wow 
 Fear and Trembling (2003) — directed by Alain Corneau, starring Sylvie Testud and Kaori Tsuji

G
 Godzilla (2014) — directed by Gareth Edwards, starring Aaron Taylor-Johnson and Ken Watanabe
 The Grudge (2004) — directed by Takashi Shimizu, starring Sarah Michelle Gellar and Jason Behr
 Gung Ho (1986) — directed by Ron Howard, starring Michael Keaton

H
 House of Bamboo (1955) — directed by Samuel Fuller, starring Robert Ryan and Robert Stack
 The Hunted (1995) — directed by J.F. Lawton, starring Christopher Lambert

I
 Into the Sun (2005) — directed by Christopher Morrison, starring Steven Seagal and Matt Davis
 Isle of Dogs (2018) — directed by Wes Anderson, starring Bryan Cranston and Edward Norton

J
 Jack London (1943) — directed by Alfred Santell, starring Michael O'Shea
 Japanil Kalyanaraman (1985) — directed by S.P. Muthuraman, starring Kamal Haasan and Radha

K
 The Karate Kid 2 (1986) — directed by John Avildsen, starring Ralph Macchio and Pat Morita
 Kill Bill vol. 1 (2003) — directed by Quentin Tarantino, starring Uma Thurman and Lucy Liu

L
 The Last Samurai (2003) — directed by Edward Zwick, starring Tom Cruise and Ken Watanabe
 Letters from Iwo Jima (2006)  — directed by Clint Eastwood, starring Ken Watanabe and Kazunari Ninomiya
 Lost in Translation (2003) — directed by Sofia Coppola, starring Bill Murray and Scarlett Johansson

M
 Mastermind (1976) — directed by Alex March, starring Zero Mostel and Keiko Kishi
 Memoirs of a Geisha (2005) — directed by Rob Marshall, starring Zhang Ziyi and Gong Li
 Mishima: A Life in Four Chapters (1985) — directed by Paul Schrader, starring Ken Ogata and Masayuki Shionoya
 Mr. Baseball (1992) — directed by Fred Schepisi, starring Tom Selleck and Ken Takakura
 Monster (2008) — directed by Eric Forsberg, starring Sarah Lieving and Erin Evans
 My Geisha (1962) — directed by Jack Cardiff, starring Shirley MacLaine and Yves Montand

N
Navy Wife (1956) — directed by Edward Bernds
Nobody's Perfect — directed by Alan Rafkin

O
Okinawa Rendez-vous — directed by Gordon Chan
Oriental Evil — directed by George P. Breakston

P

Q

R
 The Ramen Girl (2009) — directed by Robert Allan Ackerman, starring Brittany Murphy and Sohee Park
 Rhapsody in August (1991) — directed by Akira Kurosawa, starring Richard Gere and Sachiko Murase

S
 Sayonara (1957)  — directed by Joshua Logan, starring Marlon Brando and Miiko Taka
 Scooby-Doo! and the Samurai Sword — directed by Christopher Berkeley
 The Sea of Trees (2015) — directed by Gus Van Sant, starring Matthew McConaughey and Ken Watanabe
 The Sea Wolf (1930) — directed by Alfred Santell, starring Milton Sills 
 The Secret Game (1917) — directed by William C. de Mille, starring Sessue Hayakawa 
 Shogun (1980) — directed by Jerry London, starring Richard Chamberlain and Toshirō Mifune
 Snake Eyes: G.I. Joe Origins (2021) — directed by Robert Schwentke, starring Henry Golding and Andrew Koji
 Stopover Tokyo (1957) — directed by Richard L. Breen, starring Robert Wagner and Joan Collins
 Stratosphere Girl (2004) — directed by Matthias X. Oberg, starring Chloé Winkel

T
 The Teahouse of the August Moon (1956) — directed by Daniel Mann, starring Marlon Brando and Glenn Ford
 Teen Titans: Trouble in Tokyo (2006)
 Tokyo! (2008) — directed by Michel Gondry, Leos Carax and Bong Joon-ho
 Tokyo Eyes (1998) — directed by Jean-Pierre Limosin, starring Shinji Takeda and Hinano Yoshikawa
 Tokyo Fiancée (2014) — Belgian film written and directed by Stefan Liberski
 Tokyo Joe (1949)  — directed by Stuart Heisler, starring Humphrey Bogart and Alexander Knox
 Tokyo Pop (1988)  — directed by Fran Rubel Kuzui, starring Carrie Hamilton and Diamond Yukai
 Tora! Tora! Tora! (1970) — directed by Richard Fleischer and Kinji Fukasaku, starring Martin Balsam and Soh Yamamura
 Typhon sur Nagasaki (1957) — directed by Yves Ciampi, starring Jean Marais and Danielle Darrieux

UUnbroken (film) (2006)

V

W
Walk Don't Run(1966) — directed by Charles Walters, starring Cary Grant, Samantha Eggar, Jim Hutton
 Wasabi (2001) — directed by Gérard Krawczyk, starring Jean Reno and Ryōko Hirosue
 The Wolverine (2013) — directed by James Mangold, starring Hugh Jackman and Hiroyuki Sanada

X

Y
 The Yakuza (1975) — directed by Sydney Pollack, starring Robert Mitchum and Ken Takakura
Yoshiwara — directed by Max Ophüls
 You Only Live Twice'' (1967) — directed by Lewis Gilbert, starring Sean Connery and Akiko Wakabayashi

Z

 
 
History of film of Japan
Films
Japan, List of films set in